is a Japanese four-panel manga series written and illustrated by Ishiki. The manga began serialisation in Houbunsha's Manga Time Kirara magazine in 2006 and the chapters collected into 9 volumes as of 27 September 2022. An anime television series adaptation by AIC aired on TBS between April and June 2012.

Plot
The serious-minded Io and the pure-hearted Tsumiki feel they never want to be parted, but haven't become a couple yet. More than friends but less than lovers, they develop an awkward quasi-romance.

Characters

Main characters

The main female protagonist. Tsumiki is a somewhat petite girl who is dainty in stature and is hopelessly in love with Io. She has a tsundere attitude: sharp and sarcastic on the outside while loving on the inside. Whenever Io gives Tsumiki a pat on the head or Tsumiki sees something she likes, she grows cat ears. Tsumiki is unusually strong for her size and when she is about to use an immense amount of strength she emits a purple aura (for comical effect). She is also very skilled at arcade games.

The main male protagonist. Dense, yet kind at heart, he is oblivious to Tsumiki's crush on him, but she is the girl closest to him regardless and he may have feelings for her. Io is known to tease Tsumiki on occasion. He is usually seen spinning a pen with his hand, often fast enough to surprise Mayoi. At times he unknowingly acts like a casanova. He is also quite strong, though this is not shown as often as with Tsumiki. For some reason, cats are immediately drawn to him (whether or not this is a nod to Tsumiki's crush on him is unknown). He's also a part time worker at Hatch Potch.

The clumsy and air-headed member of the group. She has a very sweet and innocent personality. She also gets easily frightened compared to the other female characters. She gets nosebleeds whenever she becomes excited or infatuated by anything cute or romantic. She's also a part time worker at Hatch Potch.

Along with Sakaki, she makes up the prankster duo in the friendship circle. Very savvy with electronics and almost never seen without her lab coat, Mayoi loved to tease Tsumiki about her crush on Io. It is implied early on, that she may be a masochist. She tends to end her sentences with "nyan".

Io's best friend and partner-in-crime. Together with Mayoi, he makes up the prankster duo in the friendship circle. Like Mayoi; he is also a frequent victim of slapstick, although normally by pure accident rather than karmic backlash. His sister owns a patisserie where he, Hime and Io also work.

Other characters

A clumsy teacher who is insecure and she wants a boyfriend, although she is often depressed about it. She is a close friend of Miiko.

The shop manager of the cake shop  and Sakaki's adult sister. She is always smiling. She is to be one of Io's weaknesses as he is unable to refuse an earnest request from her. She is also a close friend to Kikue.

A student and she likes to tease Kyouya, and she is unaware of his crush on her.

A student who is a cheerful and spontaneous girl, and she is very close to Saki.

A student who is not-so-secretly in love with Saki, and he acts in a tsundere attitude around her or whenever someone mentions his crush on her.

A student with pinkish hair. She is a member of the Broadcast Committee which operates the school radio. Like Sakaki and Mayoi, she is very energetic.

Media

Manga

Anime
An anime television series adaptation animated by AIC aired in Japan between April 5 and June 28, 2012. The series ran for 12 episodes and an extra 13th was released on November 16, 2012, with the 6th Blu-ray Disc and DVD volumes in Japan. Sentai Filmworks released the series on DVD in North America on April 16, 2013.

Video game
Characters from the series appear alongside other Manga Time Kirara characters in the 2020 mobile RPG, Kirara Fantasia.

References

External links
 Official anime site 
 
 

2006 manga
2012 anime television series debuts
2012 Japanese television series endings
Anime International Company
Anime series based on manga
Houbunsha manga
Romantic comedy anime and manga
School life in anime and manga
Seinen manga
Sentai Filmworks
Slice of life anime and manga
TBS Television (Japan) original programming
Yonkoma